"Fall in Love Again" is Ms. Dynamite's second and final single from her second album, Judgement Days. It features a sample from When I Fall in Love by Ken Boothe.

Track listing

Credits and personnel
Lead vocals – Ms. Dynamite
Producers – Chink Santana
Lyrics – Chink Santana, Niomi McLean-Daley
Label: Polydor Records

Release history

References

External links
Official website

Ms. Dynamite songs
2006 singles
Songs written by Ms. Dynamite